Glossina morsitans is a species of tsetse fly in the genus Glossina. It is one of the major vectors of Trypanosoma brucei rhodesiense in African savannas.

Taxonomy
Glossina morsitans is variously classified into the subgenus Glossina or as the name species of a morsitans species group. Note that this includes both subspecies G. m. centralis and G. m. morsitans, and G. pallidipes.

G. m. submorsitans is a common substitute for G. m. morsitans, or rarely as a full species G. submorsitans.

G.m.s. is further subdivided into a G. m. s. ugandensis.

Morphology

Egg

Larvae

First instar
 long.

Second instar
 long.

Third instar
 long.

Adult
G. morsitans is occasionally distinguishable from congeners by the unaided eye - there are differences in gross coloration - if it can be observed resting. It is more readily distinguishable by microscopic examination.

Metabolism
Flight muscles are primarily powered by proline, which is synthesized from fatty acids mobilised out of the fat body. Proline is so efficiently used in muscle mitochondria because they are specialised towards proline oxidising enzymes, and away from enzymes using fatty acids and pyruvate.

Distribution

G. morsitans is found heavily throughout East Africa and Equatorial Africa: Angola, Benin, Botswana, Burkina Faso, Burundi, Cameroon, Central African Republic, Chad, Democratic Republic of the Congo, Ethiopia, The Gambia, Ghana, Guinea, Guinea-Bissau, Ivory Coast, Kenya, Malawi, Mali, Mozambique, Namibia, Niger, Nigeria, Rwanda, Senegal, Sierra Leone, South Africa, Sudan, Tanzania, Togo, Uganda, Zambia, and Zimbabwe.

Hosts
G. morsitans feeds upon warthogs, oxen, buffaloes, kudus, and humans. About 6% of G. m. s.s bloodmeals come from birds (excluding ostriches).

Genome
A sequence was made available in 2014. The sense of taste of G. m. m. lacks the sense of sweetness - which may be due to its exclusively hematophagous diet.

Genetics
G. morsitans carries 3 Ago2s according to data compiled by Mongelli & Saleh 2016 and Dowling et al 2016 finds 2 Ago3s while Mongelli & Saleh's compilation shows 3.

Symbionts
G. m. m. is in obligate symbiosis with Wigglesworthia glossinidia and Wolbachia. Without Wigglesworthia, G. m. m. is sterile, and without Wolbachia they are reproductively incompatible with normal flies.

Economic impact
Trypanosomiasis transmitted by G. morsitans and other tsetse species is one of the largest economic problems Africa faces. It has radically altered the cattle agroeconomy across the middle of Africa, severely shrinking the cattle pastoral lifestyle by shrinking the extent of safe grazing lands. Raising cattle in the manner common in 1963, this would have allowed for another 125,000,000 head - more than doubling the 114,000,000 being raised at the time.

References

Further reading

External links
 
 
 

Hippoboscoidea
Insect vectors of human pathogens
Insects described in 1851

es:Glossina morsitans morsitans